Michael Hanlon (20 December 1964 – 9 February 2016) was a British science writer and newspaper science editor.

Early life
Hanlon was born in Bristol and grew up on the Dorset coast. He studied Earth Sciences at university.

Career
Hanlon was the Science page editor at the Daily Telegraph  having previously been Science Editor at the Daily Mail, and author of articles for the Daily Express, the Independent and Irish News. He also contributed on a regular basis to several magazines, including the Spectator. He was often seen on television, or heard on the radio, as an expert in explaining science to the general public.  The Guardian called Hanlon a "top science writer."

Hanlon turned heads, including that of Ed West, when he abandoned his skepticism about global warming.  According to the Daily Telegraph, this followed a visit to the Greenland ice cap when he saw the extent of the melt for himself.

Books
 10 Questions Science Can’t Answer (Yet!): A Guide to Science’s Greatest Mysteries (2007)
 The Science of the Hitchhiker’s Guide to the Galaxy (2006)
 The Real Mars (2004)
 Eternity:Our Next Billion Years (Macmillan Science) (2008)
The Worlds of Galileo: A Jovian Odyssey (2001), co-authored with Arthur C. Clarke.

Personal life
Hanlon was married to Elena Seymenliyska, also a journalist, who works for Aeon (digital magazine). Latterly, his partner was Alison.

Hanlon died of a heart attack on 9 February 2016. He leaves behind a son, Zachary.

References

External links
 Jurassica, his project

1964 births
2016 deaths
British science writers
British science journalists
Daily Express people
Daily Mail journalists
Journalists from Bristol
People from Camberwell
Writers from Dorset